CooRie is a self-produced Japanese music unit by singer-songwriter Rino that performs songs for anime and games. CooRie used to be a two-person unit when it debuted in 2003, with Rino doing the lyrics and vocals and  doing the music compositions and arrangements. After Osada left by the end of 2003, Rino maintained the name CooRie and composed the music by herself, although she sometimes sings under her own name, especially if the song is for adult games. CooRie's records are released under Lantis and Mellow Head (On the Run).

Discography

Singles 
大切な願い / Taisetsu na Negai (Released February 26, 2003)
大切な願い / Taisetsu na Negai – anime television Nanaka 6/17 ending theme
君とナキムシ / Kimi to Nakimushi
大切な願い / Taisetsu na Negai (off vocal)
君とナキムシ / Kimi to Nakimushi (off vocal)

流れ星☆ / Nagareboshi☆ (Released April 23, 2003)
流れ星☆ / Nagareboshi☆ — anime television Narue no Sekai opening theme
ステレオ / Stereo – Radio show Narue no Sekai TV ending theme
流れ星☆ / Nagareboshi☆ (off vocal)
ステレオ / Stereo (off vocal)

サクラサクミライコイユメ／未来へのMelody / Sakura Saku Mirai Koi Yume/Mirai e no Melody (Released July 24, 2003)
<li>未来へのMelody / Mirai e no Melody – anime television D.C.: Da Capo 1st ending theme
<li>未来へのMelody / Mirai e no Melody (off vocal)

あなたと言う時間 / Anata to Iu Jikan (Released March 24, 2004)
あなたと言う時間 / Anata to Iu Jikan – anime television Hikari to Mizu no Daphne ending theme
<li>あなたと言う時間 / Anata to Iu Jikan (off vocal)

センチメンタル / Sentimental (Released April 21, 2004)
センチメンタル / Sentimental – anime television Midori no Hibi opening theme
戻らない日々 / Modoranai Hibi
センチメンタル / Sentimental (Off vocal)
戻らない日々 / Modoranai Hibi (Off vocal)

光のシルエット / Hikari no Silhouette (Released June 8, 2005)
光のシルエット / Hikari no Silhouette – anime television Zettai Shōnen opening theme
メロトロン / Mellotron
光のシルエット / Hikari no Silhouette (off vocal)
メロトロン / Mellotron (off vocal)

暁に咲く詩 / Akatsuki ni Saku Uta (Released August 24, 2005)
暁に咲く詩 / Akatsuki ni Saku Uta – anime television D.C.S.S.: Da Capo Second Season ending theme
かくれんぼ同盟 / Kakurenbo Doumei
暁に咲く詩 / Akatsuki ni Saku Uta (Off Vocal)
かくれんぼ同盟 / Kakurenbo Doumei (Off Vocal)

風～スタートライン～ / Kaze: startline (Released December 21, 2005)
風～スタートライン～ / Kaze: startline — PC game Joukyou Kaishi! opening theme
月明かりセレナード / Tsukiakari Serenade — PC game Joukyou Kaishi! ending theme
風～スタートライン～ / Kaze: startline (off vocal)
月明かりセレナード / Tsukiakari Serenade (off vocal)

いろは / Iroha (Released February 8, 2006)
いろは / Iroha — anime television Binchou-tan opening theme
君にヘッドフォン / Kimi ni Headphone
いろは / Iroha (off vocal)
君にヘッドフォン / Kimi ni Headphone (off vocal)

クロス＊ハート / Cross*Heart (Released January 24, 2007)
クロス＊ハート / Cross*Heart – anime television Kyoushirou to Towa no Sora opening theme
水玉 / Mizutama
クロス＊ハート / Cross*Heart <instrumental>
水玉 / Mizutama <instrumental>

優しさは雨のように / Yasashisa wa Ame no you ni (Released October 24, 2007)
優しさは雨のように / Yasashisa wa Ame no you ni – anime television D.C. II: Da Capo II ending theme
恋想モジュレーター / Rensou Modulator
優しさは雨のように / Yasashisa wa Ame no you ni (off vocal)
恋想モジュレーター / Rensou Modulator (off vocal)

僕たちの行方 / Bokutachi no Yukue (Released April 23, 2008)
僕たちの行方 / Bokutachi no Yukue – anime television D.C.II S.S. ~Da Capo II Second Season~ ending theme
シンプルになれ。 / Simple ni Nare.
僕たちの行方 / Bokutachi no Yukue (off vocal)
シンプルになれ。 / Simple ni Nare. (off vocal)

パルトネール / Partenaire (Released November 27, 2008)
パルトネール / Partenaire (Partner in French)
Thank you for the Music
パルトネール / Partenaire (off vocal)
Thank you for the Music (off vocal)

IF：この世界で / IF: Kono Sekai de (Released April 29, 2009)
IF：この世界で / IF: Kono Sekai de — PS2 game D.C.I.F. ~Da Capo~ Innocent Finale opening theme
ALIVE
IF：この世界で / IF: Kono Sekai de (off vocal)
ALIVE (off vocal)

星屑のサラウンド / Hoshikuzu no Surround (Released August 26, 2009)
星屑のサラウンド / Hoshikuzu no Surround — anime television Sora no Manimani ending theme
闇に咲く星のように / Yami ni Saku Hoshi no You ni – anime television Sora no Manimani Ep. 4 ending song
星屑のサラウンド / Hoshikuzu no Surround (OFF VOCAL)
闇に咲く星のように / Yami ni Saku Hoshi no You ni (OFF VOCAL)

愛永久 ～Fortune favors the brave～／めぐり愛逢い / Ai Eikyuu ~Fortune favors the brave~/Meguri Ai Ai (Released January 27, 2010)
<li>めぐり愛逢い / Meguri Ai Ai – Online game Ai Sp@ce theme song
<li>めぐり愛逢い / Meguri Ai Ai (off vocal)

夢想庭園 / Musō Teien (Released July 7, 2010)
夢想庭園 / Musō Teien – OVA Book Girl opening theme
Like A Music
夢想庭園 / Musō Teien (instrumental)
Like A Music (instrumental)

ダ・カーポIII ～キミにささげる あいのマホウ～ (Released April 27, 2012)
<li> All is love for you 
<li> All is love for you （Off Vocal） 

会いたいよ／メグル／REFLECTION (Released February 13, 2013)
<li> メグル 
<li> メグル （Off Vocal） 

『BON-BON』 (Released May 11, 2016) LACM-14477
 BON-BON – anime television Tanaka-kun is Always Listless ending theme
 Melodic Future
 BON-BON （Off Vocal）
 Melodic Future （Off Vocal）

Albums 
1st album: 秋やすみ / Aki Yasumi (Released September 29, 2004) LHCA-5001
はじめに / Hajime ni
センチメンタル / Sentimental
大切な願い / Taisetsu na Negai
あなたと言う時間 / Anata to Iu Jikan
秋やすみ / Aki Yasumi
ステレオ / Stereo
流れ星☆ / Nagareboshi☆
未来へのMelody / Mirai e no Melody
存在 / Sonzai – anime television D.C.: Da Capo 2nd ending theme
想い出トランク / Omoide Trunk
小さな手紙 / Chiisana Tegami – anime television Midori no Hibi insert song
えんぴつ / Enpitsu

Self-cover album: 木漏れ日カレンダー / Komorebi Calendar (Released March 24, 2005) LHCA-5005
そよ風のハーモニー / Soyokaze no Harmony – anime television D.C.: Da Capo insert song
空のリフレイン / Sora no Refrain – PS2 game SAKURA: setsugetsuka theme song
Parade — My-HiME Radio: Fuuka Gakuen Housoubu theme song
記憶のゆりかご / Kioku no Yurikago — anime television D.C.: Da Capo Sakura Yoshino song
幸せレシピ / Shiawase Recipe — Radio show Da Capo Hatsunejima Housoukyoku 1st opening theme
小さな傘 / Chiisana Kasa — from Mai Nakahara's mini album Homework
Precious time – PS2 game Tentama 2wins theme song
君が望む永遠 / Kimi ga Nozomu Eien – PC game Kimi ga Nozomu Eien ending theme
Eternal Love～眩しい季節～ / Eternal Love: mabushii kisetsu — PS2 game D.C.P.S.: Da Capo~ Plus Situation ending theme
Dream～The ally of～ — PC game D.C.: Da Capo ending theme

2nd album: トレモロ / Tremolo (Released June 21, 2006) LHCA-5040
光のシルエット / Hikari no Silhouette
暁に咲く詩 / Akatsuki ni Saku Uta
いたずらな雨 / Itazura na Ame
天空の花 / Tenkuu no Hana – PS2 game Mabino x Style ending theme
月明かりセレナード / Tsukiakari Serenade
バスタブブルーズ / Bathtub Blues
記憶ラブレター / Kioku Love Letter – anime television D.C.S.S.: Da Capo Second Season episodes 24 & 25 ending theme
風～スタートライン～ / Kaze: startline
心編み / Kokoroami
メロトロン / Mellotron
いろは / Iroha
トレモロ～夢の続き～ / Tremolo: yume no tsuzuki

3rd album: 旋律のフレア / Senritsu no Flare (Released January 23, 2008) LHCA-5075
旋律のフレア / Senritsu no Flare
クロス＊ハート / Cross*Heart
Spring has come – PC game D.C.II: Da Capo II ending theme
ウソツキ / Usotsuki — anime television School Days ending theme
SWEETEST – PS2 game Strawberry Panic! opening theme
君DK / Kimi DK
探し物 / Sagashimono
桜の羽根～Endless memory～ / Sakura no Hane: Endless memory — PC game D.C.II Spring Celebration grand ending theme
水玉 / Mizutama
リトル・モア / Little More — PC game Muv-Luv (all-age version) Miki Tamase ending theme
優しさは雨のように / Yasashisa wa Ame no you ni
想い / Omoi

4th album: Imagination Market (Released October 21, 2009) LHCA-5111
Listen
Imagination Market
パルトネール / Partenaire
ALIVE
僕たちの行方 / Bokutachi no Yukue
雨上がりの君のもとへ / Ame Agari no Kimi no Moto e
キミナシノセカイ / Kimi Nashi no Sekai
Thank you for the Music
想い出に変わるまで / Omoide ni Kawaru Made
君にヘッドフォン / Kimi ni Headphone
IF：この世界で / IF: Kono Sekai de
幸せになるために / Shiawase ni Naru Tame ni

5th album: Heavenly Days (Released October 20, 2010) LHCA-5121
ノスタルジアに愛を込めて / Nostalgia ni Ai wo Komete
夢想庭園 / Musō Teien
煌めきHarmonics / Kirameki Harmonics – anime television Sora no Manimani insert song
闇に咲く星のように / Yami ni Saku Hoshi no Yō ni
星屑のサラウンド / Hoshikuzu no Surround
音速タイムマシンに乗って / Onsoku Time Machine ni Notte
金色の風景 / Kin-iro no Fuukei — Bungaku Shōjo to Yumeutsutsu no Melody image song
風をあつめて 〜CooRie Bossa Mix Version〜 / Kaze wo Atsumete ~CooRie Bossa Mix Version~
Like A Music
My Dearest – PC game Kotori Love Ex P theme song
めぐり愛逢い / Meguri Ai Ai
桜風 / Sakura Kaze – PC game D.C.II Fall in Love ~Da Capo II~Fall in Love grand ending theme
Heavenly Days — Maria-sama ga Miteru movie theme

Compilation album: Brillant (Released April 4, 2013) LACA-9279 ～ LACA-9280
 disc – 1
 大切な願い / Taisetsu na Negai
 流れ星☆ / Nagareboshi
 Dream～the ally of～
 存在 / Sonzai
 未来へのMelody / Mirai he no Melody
 センチメンタル / Sentimental
 いろは / Iroha
 あなたと言う時間 / Anata to Iu Jikan
 旋律のフレア / Senritsu no Flare
 君DK / Kimi DK
 ウソツキ / Usotuski
 Spring has come
 優しさは雨のように / Yasahisa ha Ame no Youni
 君が望む永遠 / Kimi ga Nozomu Eien
 disc – 2
 クロス＊ハート / Cross Heart
 光のシルエット / Hikari no Silhouette
 暁に咲く詩 / Akatsuki ni Saku Uta
 僕たちの行方 / Bokutachi no Yukue
 雨上がり君のもとへ / Ameagari Kimi no Moto he
 パルトネール / Partenaire
 星屑のサラウンド / Hoshikuzu no Surround
 Thank you for the Music
 IF：この世界で / IF – Kono Sekai de
 夢想庭園 / Musou Teien
 Heavenly Days
 水性メロディ / Suisei Melody
 All is Love for you
 秘密 / Himitsu
Self Cover album: Melodium (Released December 18, 2013) LACA-15363
DreamRiser 
Super Noisy Nova 
いじわるな恋 / Ijiwaru na Koi
残酷な願いの中で / Zankoku na Negai no Naka de
ナミダで咲く花 / Namida de Saku Hana
宿題 / Shukudai
陽だまりドライブ / Hidamari Drive
心の窓辺にて / Kokoro no Madobe Nite
君と愛になる / Kimi to Ai ni Naru
Brand-new Season
透明な羽根で / Toumei no Hana de
PIANOTE

Self Cover album: Melodium2 (Released December 9, 2015) LACA-15532
 Planet Freedom
 Sentimental Venus
 REFLECTION
 ひだまり笑顔 / Hida mari egao
 ハルモニア/ Harumonia
 Melodium

6th Album セツナポップに焦がされて / Setsuna Pop ni Kogasarete ''' (Released December 20, 2017) LACA-15668
 エクレア / Ekurea
 セツナポップに焦がされて / Setsuna Pop ni Kogasarete
 Rearhythm -Album ver-
 愛しさの雫 / Itoshisa no shizuku
 終わらないPrelude / Owaranai Prelude
 HAPPY CRESCENDO
 フラクタル / Furakutaru (Fractal)
 春風とクリシェ / Harukaze to kurishe
 MISTY LOVE
 キミとMUSIC -Album ver- / Kimi to MUSIC -Album ver-
 VOICE SONG
 BON-BON

 Other 
 2003-12-26: Onegai Twins Image Vocal Album: Esquisse — episode 6 image song "Kiss no Meiro" (キスの迷路)
 2006-09-21: PlayStation 2 Game Strawberry Panic! Original Sound Track — opening theme "Sweetest"
 2006-10-25: "MUV-LUV" collection of Standard Edition songs: divergence — Muv-Luv Extra Miki Tamase ending theme "Little More" (リトル・モア)
 2007-05-23: D.C.II Spring Celebration Vocal Mini Album: Songs from D.C.II Spring Celebration — grand ending theme "Sakura no Hane: Endless memory" (桜の羽根～Endless memory～)
 2007-08-22: School Days Ending Theme+'' — anime television ending theme "Usotsuki" (ウソツキ)

References

External links 
CooRie Official Blog
CooRie Official Web Site (Unupdated)
CooRie Lantis website

Anime musicians
Japanese women singer-songwriters
Japanese singer-songwriters
Lantis (company) artists
21st-century Japanese singers
Living people
Year of birth missing (living people)
21st-century Japanese women singers